Loren Rex Cameron (August 28, 1959 - November 18, 2022) was an American photographer, author and transgender activist. His work includes portraits and self-portraits consisting of transsexual bodies in both clothed and nude form.

Biography
Loren Rex Cameron was born in Pasadena, California on August 28, 1959.  In 1969, after his mother's death, he moved to rural Arkansas where he lived as a self-described tomboy on his father's farm. By the age of 16, Cameron identified as a lesbian and encountered homophobia in the small town where he lived. At this time, Cameron quit school and left home to seek work as a construction worker and other blue collar employment. In 1979, he moved to the San Francisco Bay Area where he identified socially with the lesbian community until the age of 26, when he confronted his dissatisfaction with his body and was excluded from the lesbian community. Cameron's interest in photography coincided with the beginning of his transition from female to male, which he documented photographically. In 1993 Cameron began studying the basics of photography and started photographing the transsexual community. Since 1994, he has given lectures on his work at universities, educational conferences and art institutes. By 1995, Cameron's photographs had been shown in solo exhibitions in San Francisco, Minneapolis, and Los Angeles.

Photography
Cameron's photography and writing was first published by Cleis Press in 1996. His first published works (Body Alchemy: Transsexual Portraits and Man Tool: The Nuts and Bolts of Female-to-Male Surgery) consist largely of self-portraits, and portraits of other female to male transsexuals. Body Alchemy documented Cameron's personal experience of transition from female to male, his life as a man, and the everyday lives of trans men he knew. The nude figures' poses in the artist's photography often portray moments of action and performance. In many of his self portraits, he includes the shutter-release bulb that he used to take the photograph. The choice to work alone and feature the bulb serves as a commentary on the self-made aspect of being transsexual. His photography shows how the issues of queer bioethics come up not only in clinical sites but also in public art and museum spaces. His work was intended to remove the clinical view of transsexual bodies and redefine them as not in need of a cure. Body Alchemy became a double 1996 Lambda Literary Award winner. It remains his most well-known work to date, though he has since published other photographic works. More recently published work includes representation of both female and male transsexuals, portraits and classical nudes (Body Photographs by Loren Cameron Volume 1 and 2.

Cameron's work was first shown as part of a 1994 exhibit in San Francisco. His images have also been exhibited in Los Angeles, Minneapolis, in Santiago, Chile, Buenos Aires, Argentina, Sao Paulo, Brazil, and in Mexico City. They have been published in numerous books such as Constructing Masculinity: Discussions in Contemporary Culture and Leslie Feinberg's Transgender Warriors. He has also posed for photographers such as Daniel Nicoletta, Amy Arbus, and Howard Shatz. Cameron has lectured at universities across the United States, including Smith College, Harvard, Cornell, Brown, the University of California at Berkeley, Penn State, and the School of the Art Institute of Chicago. In May 2008, Cameron presented his work at the Palais de Tokyo in Paris. He was profiled on the Discovery Health Channel's LGBT-themed special Sex Change: Him to Her, and on the National Geographic Channel's Taboo "Sexual Identity" series. He was also interviewed in The New Yorker magazine.

Reception 
Cameron's work is controversial among critics. Many praise his photographs as compelling and informative, while others criticize it for being sexually explicit.

In 2012, The University of Minnesota-Duluth invited Loren Cameron to campus to present his photography. The University paid Cameron $4,000 from student services  to cover his speaker’s fee and travel expenses. This decision was met with a backlash, due to him and his subjects' identity as transsexual individuals, as well as the nudity in Cameron’s work. Despite the objections, Cameron delivered his presentation on September 26, 2012.

Body Alchemy is considered by some to be influential for bringing attention to the social and medical issues that transsexual people face.

Books 

Body Alchemy: Transsexual Portraits. 1996, Cleis Press. .
Cuerpos fotografiados por Cameron: fotografías. Volume 1. 2009, Taller Experimental Cuerpos Pintados. .
Cuerpos fotografiados por Cameron: fotografías. Volume 2. 2009, Taller Experimental Cuerpos Pintados. .

Awards and recognition

Lambda Literary Award, Inaugural Transgender Category, 1997
 Lambda Literary Award, Small Press Category, 1997
 Lambda Literary Award Nominee, Best Photography Category, 1997
1997 FTM International Pride Award

References
 All biographical information is taken from Body Alchemy: Transsexual Portraits and the biography section of Online Alchemy as of November 11, 2008.

Further reading 
 The Transiting Self: The Nude Self-Portraits of Transman Loren Cameron and Hermaphrodyke Del La Grace Volcano - by Tee A. Corinne - College Art Association Conference paper, 2002

American photographers
American LGBT photographers
LGBT people from California
Living people
1959 births
Transgender men
Transgender artists
Transgender rights activists
Lambda Literary Award winners